The 2021–22 season was West Bromwich Albion's 144th year in their history, and first season back in the Championship, since the 2019–20 season, following relegation in the previous season. Along with the league, the club also competed in the FA Cup and the EFL Cup. The season covered the period from 1 July 2021 to 30 June 2022.

Managerial changes
On 24 June 2021, Valérien Ismaël was appointed as the club's new head coach on a four-year contract after a compensation package with Barnsley was agreed for his services. Ismael then left the club by mutual consent on 2 February, leading to West Brom announcing the arrival of new head coach Steve Bruce on an 18 month deal a day later.

Pre-season friendlies
WBA announced they will play a friendly against Woking, Watford, Walsall and Birmingham City as part of the pre-season preparations.

Competitions

Championship

League table

Results summary

Results by matchday

Matches
WBA's fixtures were confirmed on 24 June 2021.

FA Cup

West Brom were drawn at home to Brighton & Hove Albion in the third round.

EFL Cup

WBA entered the competition in the second round and were drawn at home to Arsenal.

Transfers

Transfers in

Loans in

Loans out

Transfers out

Statistics

|}

Goals record

Disciplinary record

End of season awards
The winners of the 2021/22 end of season West Bromwich Albion awards were announced on 6 May 2022. 

 Supporters’ Player of the Season - Matthew Clarke
 Players’ Player of the Season – Karlan Grant
 Top Goalscorer – Karlan Grant (18)
 Goal of the Season – Alex Mowatt v Cardiff (A)
 Young Player of the Season – Taylor Gardner-Hickman

References

West Bromwich Albion
West Bromwich Albion F.C. seasons